Carlye Chu Fun-ling (born 1960) is a Hong Kong judge. She has served as a Vice President of the Court of Appeal of the High Court since November 2022.

Education and legal career
Chu graduated from the University of Hong Kong with an LLB in 1982 and a PCLL in 1983. She was called to the Hong Kong Bar in 1983. She received her LLM from the London School of Economics in 1985. She was a barrister in private practice from 1985 until 1991.

Chu obtained a Master of Social Sciences in Criminology from the University of Hong Kong in 1994.

Judicial career
In 1991, Chu joined the bench as a Permanent Magistrate. In 1995, she became a District Judge.

She was appointed as Deputy Registrar of the High Court in 1997, as Registrar of the High Court in 1999, and as Judge of Court of First Instance of the High Court in 2000.

In 2011, Chu was elevated to the Court of Appeal.

Chu acted as Returning Officer for the 2005 and 2017 Hong Kong Chief Executive elections.

Chu is a member of the Judicial Officers Recommendation Commission.

In October 2022, Chu was part of a team of 3 judges who ruled against Jimmy Lai and said that "despite its importance to the freedom of the press, the protection afforded to journalistic material is not absolute."

In November 2022, Chu was appointed as Vice President of the Court of Appeal.

References

Living people
1960 births
Alumni of the University of Hong Kong
Alumni of the London School of Economics
Hong Kong judges
Barristers of Hong Kong